The ARIA Digital Track Chart ranks the best-performing digital tracks of Australia. It is published by Australian Recording Industry Association (ARIA), an organisation who collects music data for the weekly ARIA Charts.
To be eligible to appear on the chart, the recording must be a single not an EP and only paid downloads counted from downloadable outlets.

Chart history

Number-one artists

See also
List of number-one singles of 2008 (Australia)

References

Australia Digital Singles
2008 in Australian music
Digital 2008